Whare Henry is a New Zealand former rugby league footballer who represented New Zealand in the 1977 World Cup.

Playing career
Henry moved to Wellington from Taupo in 1972. Henry played for both the Marist and Eastern Suburbs clubs in the Wellington Rugby League competition. He represented Wellington and Central Districts.

In 1977 he was selected for the New Zealand national rugby league team and he played in two matches at that year's World Cup.

Personal life
Henry's brother, Whetu, played for the Kiwis alongside him in 1977. A nephew, also called Whetu, played for the Wellington Lions in 2011. Other relations include Alex Chan and Brackin Karauria-Henry.

References

Living people
New Zealand rugby league players
New Zealand national rugby league team players
Wellington rugby league team players
Central Districts rugby league team players
Rugby league locks
New Zealand Māori rugby league players
Year of birth missing (living people)